Primuloideae is a subfamily of the family Primulaceae in the order Ericales. Formerly it represented the Primulaceae family (Primulaceae s.s.), before the latter was enlarged (Primulaceae s.l.) by addition of three other closely related families that formerly represented the order Primulales.

References

Asterid subfamilies
Primulaceae